Ihor Dziuba (born 1983) is a Ukrainian long track speed skater who participates in international competitions.

Personal records

Career highlights

European Allround Championships
2008 - Kolomna,  30th
National Championships
2004 - Kyiv,  3rd at 5000 m
2004 - Kyiv,  3rd at 1500 m
2004 - Kyiv,  3rd at 1000 m
2004 - Kyiv,  3rd at 10000 m

External links
Dziuba at Jakub Majerski's Speedskating Database
Dziuba at SkateResults.com

1983 births
Ukrainian male speed skaters
Living people